Susan Harper may refer to:
Susan Harper (diplomat) (born 1952), Canadian diplomat
Susan Harper (My Family), a character in the British sitcom My Family